Cyrtodactylus ngoiensis, also known as the Ngoi bent-toed gecko, is a species of gecko endemic to Laos.

References

Cyrtodactylus
Reptiles described in 2020
Reptiles of Laos
Endemic fauna of Laos